Michele Cusa (1799 – October 17, 1870) was an Italian painter.

He was born in Rimella Valsesia. He trained initially in Varallo, then studied at the Brera Academy of Milan under Giuseppe Gaudenzio Mazzola from Valduggia. In Turin in 1828, he won a stipend to study in Rome until he was recruited by the king to teach at the Albertina Academy.

Late in life he retired to Varallo, where he worked at reproducing in two dimensions all the scenes depicted in the 45 chapels of the Sacro Monte di Varallo. Cusa's work was published in 1862. He earned the Cross of Knights of the Order of Santi Maurizio e Lazzaro.

References

1799 births
1870 deaths
19th-century Italian painters
Italian male painters
Brera Academy alumni
Academic staff of Accademia Albertina
Painters from Piedmont
19th-century Italian male artists